Emily Khoury Shetty (born January 11, 1984) is an American politician and attorney, a member of the Maryland House of Delegates representing District 18.

Early life and career 
Shetty was born in Fairfax, Virginia. She attended Duke University, where she received a Bachelor of Arts in Mathematics in 2005. Shetty later attended the Columbus School of Law at the Catholic University of America where she received her Juris Doctor. in 2008. Shetty was admitted to the Maryland Bar in 2009.

From 2008 to 2012, Shetty worked for U.S. Representative Edolphus Towns (D-NY), first as legislative assistant, and then legislative director.

From 2012 to 2014, she was Senior Director of Federal Legislative Affairs at the Leukemia and Lymphoma Society.

Shetty was a member of the Montgomery County Democratic Central Committee from 2013 to 2014 and 2015 to 2018, including as vice-chair from 2017 to 2018.

Shetty was a consultant at the Stanton Park Group from 2014 to 2018.

From 2018 to 2020, Shetty was vice president of advocacy at Horizon Government Affairs, which she left in 2020 and founded Step Up Advocacy.

Maryland House of Delegates 
Shetty was elected to the Maryland House of Delegates in 2018 with 30.4% of the vote, the most of any candidate (the top three vote-getters became delegates for the district). She was sworn in on January 9, 2019.

From 2020 to 2022, Shetty has served as one of the thirteen Deputy Majority Whips.

In January 2023, Shetty was announced as Democratic Caucus Chair.

Caucuses and committee assignments 
Shetty is a member of the Women Legislators of Maryland caucus, the Maryland Legislative Transit Caucus, and is an associate member of the Maryland Legislative Latino Caucus.

She is a member of the Judiciary Committee, the Family and Juvenile Law Subcommittee, and the Public Safety Subcommittee.

Personal life 
Shetty is married, with one child.

Distinctions 
In 2020, the Daily Record awarded Shetty its Leading Women Award for her work on healthcare legislation.

References

Living people
Politicians from Fairfax, Virginia
21st-century American politicians
Duke University Trinity College of Arts and Sciences alumni
Columbus School of Law alumni
Women state legislators in Maryland
Democratic Party members of the Maryland House of Delegates
Maryland lawyers
21st-century American women politicians
1984 births